Anika Tiplady (born 21 August 1980) is a former New Zealand rugby union player. She debuted for the Black Ferns on 16 October 2007 against Australia at Wanganui.

Biography 
Tiplady was born and raised in Christchurch and is of Māori descent from the Ngāi Tahu iwi. She graduated from the University of Otago with a Bachelor of Medicine, Bachelor of Surgery degree.

In May 2008, Tiplady was part of the NZ Army Women's team that played the British Army as part of their Centenary Tour of New Zealand.

Tiplady was named in the Black Ferns squad to travel to England for a three-match tour in 2012.

References

External links 

 Black Ferns Profile

1980 births
Living people
New Zealand female rugby union players
New Zealand women's international rugby union players